Patrick Palles Lorne Elphinstone Welch, (12 August 1916 – 15 May 1998), known as Lorne Welch, was a British engineer, pilot and Colditz prisoner of war.

He was educated at Stowe School and became an engineer and then an engine test flight observer at the Royal Aircraft Establishment, Farnborough. He also learned to fly gliders at the London Gliding Club. He took up powered flying, becoming an instructor in 1939. He moved on to multi-engined aircraft and trained pilots on Wellington bombers. In order to improve morale 'Thousand Bomber' raids were organised using every available pilot, including instructors, but Welch was shot down on his fourth raid. He gave himself up at Amsterdam station when the Germans began firing at civilians.

He was sent to Stalag Luft III where he assisted in "The Great Escape" by building the ventilation pump & fixed links for the tunnel through which 76 prisoners escaped. Later Welch also escaped with Walter Morison during the Delousing Break attempt, planning to steal a German aircraft while wearing fake German uniforms. After two attempts they were re-captured and sent to Colditz. The Colditz Cock glider was already under construction, and Welch performed vital stress calculations. Although the original glider never flew, a replica was successfully flown in February 2000.

While at Colditz he entered a competition, sponsored by the Royal Ocean Racing Club, for prisoners of war to design an offshore yacht of 32–35 ft waterline length. Via the Red Cross, he submitted detailed drawings and calculations and won the first prize of £50.

He was liberated in 1945. He returned to Farnborough to work on rocket motors before becoming chief instructor of the Surrey Gliding Club at Redhill, a test pilot for new aircraft for the British Gliding Association and a British team pilot in four world gliding championships.

After the war, he became the first pilot to soar a glider twice across the English Channel: first from Redhill to Brussels in a DFS 108 Weihe, and then in a two-seater glider with Frank Irving.

He married Ann Douglas, also a pilot and sailor, in 1953. His retirement was spent sailing and working on his boat. Lorne Welch died on 15 May 1998. He was survived by his wife and their daughter.

References
 The Times obituary 1998

1916 births
1998 deaths
People educated at Stowe School
Royal Air Force officers
British World War II pilots
Royal Air Force personnel of World War II
World War II prisoners of war held by Germany
Participants in the Great Escape from Stalag Luft III
Prisoners of war held at Colditz Castle
Glider pilots